William Gifford Cookesley (1 December 1802 – 16 August 1880) was an English classical scholar and cleric.

Life
He was born at Brasted in Kent, and was educated at Eton College and at King's College, Cambridge, where he graduated B.A. in 1825, M.A. in 1827. He was one of the assistant masters at Eton for many years.

In 1857, Cookesley was appointed vicar of Hayton, East Riding of Yorkshire, and became incumbent of St. Peter's, Hammersmith, in 1860, and rector of Tempsford, Bedfordshire, in 1868. He died on 16 August 1880.

Works
Cookesley's publications on classical subjects were:

 Selections from Pindar. With English Notes, 1838.
 Pindari Carmina. Notas quasdam Anglice scriptas adjecit G.G.C., 1844, (another edition, pars prima, 1850, and an edition in 2 vols., 1851). 
 Selecta e Catullo (with notes), 1845.
 Account and Map of the Ancient City of Rome, 1850; and a similar Account and Map of Ancient Athens, 1851 (also 1852). 
 Selecta e Propertio (with notes), 1851.
 Eton Selections from Ovid and Tibullus (with notes), 1859 (another edition, 1860).
 Cæsar's Gallic War (with English notes), 1861.

Cookesley also published:

 Sermons, London, 1843; and Old Windsor Sermons, London, 1844. 
 A revised translation of the New Testament, 1859.
 A few Remarks on some of the more prominent errors contained in Bishop Colenso's Book on the Pentateuch, London, 1863.
 Memorial Sketch of F. J. Cookesley, edited by W. G. C., 1867. 
 Various pamphlets published between 1845 and 1867.

Cricket career
Cookesley was a first-class cricketer associated with Cambridge University, active from 1822 to 1827. He is recorded in 4 matches, totalling 34 runs with a highest score of 30, holding no catches and taking 2 wickets.

References

Attribution

1802 births
1880 deaths
19th-century English Anglican priests
English classical scholars
English cricketers of 1787 to 1825
English cricketers of 1826 to 1863
Cambridge University cricketers
Scholars of ancient Greek literature
Scholars of Latin literature
People educated at Eton College
Alumni of King's College, Cambridge
People from Brasted